Dundarrah is a rural locality in the North Burnett Region, Queensland, Australia.

Geography
The Isis Highway forms the western boundary and the Mount Walsh National Park is to the east.

References 

North Burnett Region
Localities in Queensland